Eduard Kaçaçi (born 9 January 1967) is an Albanian retired footballer who played as a striker for Partizani Tirana.

International career
He made his debut for Albania in a September 1990 friendly match against Greece and earned a total of 2 caps, scoring no goals.

His second and final international was a November 1990 European Championship qualification match against France.

Defection
Kaçaçi, alongside national team members Lorenc Leskaj and Genc Ibro, disappeared from the national team squad in March 1991 in Geneva on their way to Paris to play a European Championship qualifier against France. At the time, Albania was still ruled by the communists. The players were later reported to have sought asylum in Switzerland.

Honours
Albanian Superliga: 1
 1987

References

External links

1967 births
Living people
Association football forwards
Albanian footballers
Albania international footballers
FK Partizani Tirana players
Kategoria Superiore players
Albanian defectors
Albanian expatriate footballers
Expatriate footballers in Germany
Albanian expatriate sportspeople in Germany